Chandigarh is a city and a union territory in the northern part of India that serves as the capital of the states of Punjab and Haryana. As a union territory, the city is ruled directly by the Union Government of India and is not part of either state.

The city of Chandigarh was the first planned city in India post-independence in 1947 and is known internationally for its architecture and urban design.

Normally any place in India has representation at 3 levels: National (Parliament), State (Legislative Assembly) & local (Municipality or Panchayat). Chandigarh being a city-state, and a Union Territory does not have a legislative assembly of its own, even though it hosts the legislative assemblies of two states Punjab & Haryana, being a common capital of both states. It has its own Municipal Corporation (MCC), which acts as the local governing authority of Chandigarh. The MCC is one of the most powerful local authorities in India as it serves both as a regional and local authority.

Legislative Assembly (Before 1966)
From 1952 to 1966 (the year Haryana was carved out of Punjab) Chandigarh was the capital of Punjab. Citizens of the city were represented in the state's Legislative Assembly and a Chief Commissioner headed the local administration. While Punjab had remained undivided, Chandigarh, like other large cities of India, fitted into the larger framework of the state administration. When Punjab was divided, both Punjab and Haryana claimed the new city for its capital. Pending resolution of the issue, the Central Government made Chandigarh a Union Territory (under Section 4 of the Punjab Re-organisation Act, 1966, with effect from 1 November 1966) with its administration functioning directly under the Central Government. Under the provisions of this Act, the laws in force in the erstwhile State of Punjab before 1 November 1966, continue to apply to the Union Territory of Chandigarh.

Administrator (After 1966)
Up to 31 May 1984, the Administrator of the UT was designated as "Chief Commissioner". On 1 June 1984, the Governor of Punjab has been functioning as the Administrator of the Union Territory of Chandigarh and Chief Commissioner was redesignated as "Adviser to the Administrator". List of Administrators of Chandigarh is as follows:

Parliamentary Constituency

Presently the city is represented in Indian Parliament by Mrs. Kiran Kher of BJP.
Before her, Mr. Pawan Bansal of Congress was MP from Chandigarh. He became Minister of Railways but had to quit due to corruption charges.

Local politics

Mrs Raj Bala Malik is the Mayor of the city.

References